Rodovia Marechal Cândido Rondon (officially designated SP-300) is a highway in the state of São Paulo, Brazil.

It is one of the most recent highways of the state, and connects several cities, running in the North-Northwest direction, starting in Jundiai and serving the cities of Itu, Porto Feliz, Tietê, Laranjal Paulista, Conchas, Botucatu, São Manuel, Areiópolis, Lençois Paulista, Agudos, Bauru, Avaí, Lins, Penápolis, Birigui, Araçatuba, Andradina and Três Lagoas, until it reaches the border with the state of Mato Grosso do Sul, by the Paraná River. It is the second longest highway in São Paulo, with 620 km.

It was named after Brazilian hero and protector of Indians Marshal Cândido Rondon.

The highway is managed and maintained by the Department of Roads of the State of São Paulo (DER), Rodovias das Colinas, Rodovias do Tietê, Via Rondon and BR Vias. Toll is not required.

See also
 Highway system of São Paulo
 Brazilian Highway System

Highways in São Paulo (state)